The Duffield Memorial is a gravesite monument located in the churchyard of the Church of St Mary in Great Baddow, Essex, England. Designed by Herbert Maryon and installed in 1912, it originally commemorated Marianne Duffield and William Ward Duffield, who died in 1910 and 1912 respectively. A second plaque was added to commemorate their son, William Bartleet Duffield, who died in 1918.

The memorial covers the grave, and comprises edging and a vertical cross. It is designed in the Art Nouveau style and is made of riveted sections of copper alloy sheet metal. The edging follows the rectangular perimeter of the plot, and features short pillars at each corner. The cross is a Celtic wheel cross decorated in relief with leaflike motifs. A curved shaft connects it to the foot, which, like the four-sided base upon which it is mounted, has curved and splayed sides. The plaques commemorating the Duffields are riveted to the base; a medallion was once riveted to the centre of the cross, but is now lost.

Newspapers at the time termed the memorial "very fine" and "quite unique" for the area, and in 2022 it was designated a Grade II listed building. The list entry terms the memorial "an unusual example" of both "churchyard memorial design" and "Art Nouveau design in metal work" and describes it as "well detailed and combined with a conventional form of churchyard memorial, a Celtic wheeled cross".

Background

The Duffields 
The Duffields were a prominent family in Chelmsford, having settled in Great Baddow by the time of Henry VIII. William Ward Duffield was born on 25 November 1820 to James Duffield, a farmer. He went on to become a successful solicitor, founding the Chelmsford firm Duffield and Son, and the London firm Duffield, Bruty and Co. He also held many public roles, including as clerk to the Chelmsford Board of Governors, clerk to the Justices at Chelmsford, registrar of the Chelmsford County Court and Bankruptcy Court, and governor (and later chairman) of the King Edward VI School. His private positions included roles as director and chairman of a range of businesses, including the Reliance Life Assurance Company, the London Board of the Norwich Union, the Chelmsford and Braintree Gas Companies, and the Chelmsford and Blackwater Navigation Company.

Duffield married Marianne Bartleet on 10 March 1860. The couple had three surviving children: William Bartleet Duffield (1861–1918), Arthur Stewart Duffield (1867–1930), and Florence Marion Duffield. Marianne Duffield died on 22 June 1910, three months after the couple had celebrated their 50th anniversary. She was buried in the churchyard of Church of St Mary in Great Baddow, following a family tradition of several generations. Her husband died two years later, on 7 August 1912, and was buried in the same grave. William Bartleet Duffield died a bachelor six years later in France, where he had been wintering for his health.

Herbert Maryon 

At the time of William Ward Duffield's death, Herbert Maryon was 38 years old and a teacher of sculpture at the University of Reading. Maryon had studied at The Slade, Saint Martin's School of Art, and the Central School of Arts and Crafts, where his teachers included Alexander Fisher and William Lethaby. He subsequently led the Keswick School of Industrial Art from 1900 to 1904, where he designed numerous Arts and Crafts works, and taught metalwork at the Storey Institute. Maryon taught at Reading from 1907 to 1927, then at Armstrong College (part of Durham University at the time) until 1939. Maryon designed a number of other memorials while a teacher, including First World War monuments for East Knoyle, Mortimer, and the University of Reading. After the Second World War Maryon went on a second career as a conservator at the British Museum; his work on the Sutton Hoo ship-burial led to his appointment as an Officer of the Order of the British Empire.

Description 
It is made of riveted sections of copper alloy sheet metal and designed in an Art Nouveau style. It consists of edging that follows the rectangular perimeter of the grave, and a vertical cross. Small pillars rise from each of the four corners. The memorial is placed over the grave of the Duffields, which is made of brick.

The cross sits within the grave plot and surrounding edging. It features a Celtic wheel cross connected by a shaft to a four-sided base. The wheel is decorated in relief with leaflike motifs; a medallion, now removed, was once riveted to the centre. The shaft is curved, and meets the curved and splayed edges of the foot. This is mounted atop the base, which features similar lines.

Two copper plaques are riveted to opposite sides of the base. The west-facing plaque commemorates the elder Duffields, and reads:

The east-facing plaque reads:

History 
The memorial was erected around October 1912, within two months of William Duffield's death. Newspapers reported on it on 25 and 26 October, praising it as "very fine" and "admirably executed", and noting that it was "quite unique, at any rate in this neighbourhood". After William Bartleet Duffield died on 3 June 1918, the east-facing plaque was added to the memorial to commemorate him.

On 25 July 2022, Historic England designated the memorial a Grade II listed building. The organisation cited historic interest, architectural interest, and group value, for listing the memorial. As to historic interest, Historic England termed the memorial "an unusual example of churchyard memorial design that is also memorial to prominent local citizen William Ward Duffield and his son". Architecturally, the organisation cited the "unusual example of Art Nouveau design in metal work, well detailed and combined with a conventional form of churchyard memorial, a Celtic wheeled cross". For group value, Historic England considered the memorial in conjunction with the Church of St Mary, itself a Grade I listed building.

Notes

References

Bibliography

External links 
 Photographs at Find a Grave

Grade II listed buildings in Essex
Monuments and memorials in Essex
1912 establishments in England
Outdoor sculptures in England